Kirsten Emmelmann ( Siemon; born 19 April 1961 in Warnemünde, Bezirk Rostock) is a German former track and field athlete who represented East Germany in the 1980s in the 400 meter sprint.  Her biggest success came as a member of the 4 × 400 meter relay: in 1987 she was world champion, and at the 1988 Summer Olympics her team was third.  Her biggest individual success came at the World athletics championship in 1987 when she was third.

Results
1982, European Championship: 1st place with the 4 × 400 meter relay (under the name Kirsten Siemon; World record: 3:19.05 min, with Sabine Busch, Marita Koch und Dagmar Neubauer-Rübsam)
1986, European championship: 4th place in the 400 meter (50.43 s); 1st place with the 4 × 400 meter relay (3:16.87 min, with Sabine Busch, Petra Müller, Marita Koch)
1987, World championship: 3rd place in the 400 meter (50.20 s); 1st place in the 4 × 400 meter relay (3:18.63 min, with Sabine Busch, Dagmar Neubauer and Petra Müller)
1988, Olympic Games: 3rd place in the 4 × 400 meter relay (3:18.29 min, with Sabine Busch, Dagmar Neubauer and Petra Müller)

Emmelmann represented sport club Empor Rostock (trainer Wolfgang Meier) and after she got married she went to sport club Magdeburg (trainer Klaus Wübbenhorst).  During her sporting career she was 1.73 meters tall and weighed 63 kilograms.  She was married in 1984 to Frank Emmelmann, a 100-meter sprinter.  After the end of her career she worked in a sporting goods store.

References

1961 births
Living people
Sportspeople from Rostock
People from Bezirk Rostock
East German female sprinters
Athletes (track and field) at the 1988 Summer Olympics
Olympic athletes of East Germany
Olympic bronze medalists for East Germany
World Athletics Championships athletes for East Germany
World Athletics Championships medalists
European Athletics Championships medalists
Medalists at the 1988 Summer Olympics
Olympic bronze medalists in athletics (track and field)
Recipients of the Patriotic Order of Merit in bronze
World Athletics Championships winners
Olympic female sprinters